LANSA Flight 501 was a domestic flight from Lima to Cusco operated by a Lockheed L-749 Constellation aircraft registration OB-R-771. On 27 April 1966 flight 501 crashed into a mountain side in Tomas District.

The plane radioed a distress call 10 minutes after takeoff. At least four Americans, two Swiss, one Canadian, three Germans and one Spaniard were on board. Three of the Americans were Peace Corps volunteers.

References

Bibliography
 

Accidents and incidents involving the Lockheed Constellation
Aviation accidents and incidents in Peru
Airliner accidents and incidents involving controlled flight into terrain
Aviation accidents and incidents in 1966
1966 in Peru
April 1966 events in South America
LANSA accidents and incidents 
1966 disasters in Peru